Sri Ganganagar is a planned city and the northernmost city of the Indian state of Rajasthan, near the international border of India and Pakistan. It is the administrative headquarters of Sri Ganganagar district. It is named after Maharaja Shri Ganga Singh Bahadur, Maharaja of Bikaner. The city is also known as the "food basket of Rajasthan".

History

Sri Ganganagar was established by Maharaja Ganga Singh. It was part of Bikaner state. Sri Ganganagar is one of the first well-planned modern cities of India, it is said to be influenced by the town planning of Paris. It is divided into residential blocks and a commercial area which includes a Dhan Mandi (agricultural marketplace). 

It is at the point where the Sutlej waters enter Rajasthan, and where it entered the erstwhile Bikaner State. It is said by the elders that this area first came under the jurisdiction of Bahawalpur state. But due to the large open area, the area was unguarded, and Hindu Mal (a companion of Maharaja Ganga Singh) took advantage of this opportunity and moved the posts along the boundary. He started his journey to change posts from Suratgarh in the south, and went until what is now Hindumalkot in the north. He informed the Maharaja about his successful invasion of the area when he reached the northern part and thereafter died, giving name to the city Hindumalkot.

In 1899–1900, the Bikaner State was affected by a severe famine. To resolve this issue, Maharaja Ganga Singh obtained the services of AWE Standley, an engineer, who demonstrated the feasibility of the western area of the Bikaner State being irrigated by the waters of the Sutlej. The plan of the Sutlej Valley Project was drawn by the chief engineer of Punjab, RG Kennedy, according to which the vast area of erstwhile Bikaner State could be brought under irrigation. However, the project was delayed due to objections by the state of Bahawalpur.

With the intervention of the Viceroy of India, Lord Curzon in 1906, a Tripartite Conference was held and an agreement was reached on 4 September 1920. The foundation stone of the Canal Head Works at Ferozepur was laid on 5 December 1925 and the work completed in 1927 by constructing  of lined canal. The opening ceremony was performed on 26 October 1927 by Lord Irwin, then Viceroy of India.

The plan for the city of Sri Ganganagar was drawn at this time. Irrigated parts of Bikaner State were brought under Sri Ganganagar district. Part of the district was later split off to form Hanumangarh district in 1994.

Location and area
It is surrounded on the east by Hanumangarh district, (formerly part of Sri Ganganagar district) on the south by Bikaner District, on the west by Bahawalnagar district of the Pakistani Punjab, and on the north by Fazilka district of Indian Punjab.

Political representation
 Member of Parliament: Nihalchand, Bhartiya Janata Party. 
 Member of Legislative Assembly: Raj Kumar Gaur, Independent politician.

Topography
 Indira Gandhi Canal, the largest canal in India, is located in Sri Ganganagar district.

Although Sri Ganganagar district lies in the Thar Desert, irrigation via the Indira Gandhi and Ganga Canals has changed the flora and fauna. The district can be classified into five geographical regions:

 The region irrigated by the Ganga Canal and the Bhakra canal tributaries: the northern region, which is 3/4 of the district, resembles the fertile plains of Punjab. Some areas, like the area between the towns of Raisinghnagar and Vijaynagar, have desert-like conditions.
 Area irrigated by the Suratgarh branch of the Indira Gandhi canal
 Area irrigated by Anupgarh branch of Indira Gandhi canal: It comprises Anupgarh and Gharsana tehsils. It is the southernmost region of the district, much of which has been converted into plains, but some sand dunes remain.
 The Naali belt: This is a narrow basin of the Ghaggar River, the only major river of the district. It is a seasonal river which flows only in the rainy season. It enters the district near Suratgarh and flows in areas of Jaitsar, Vijaynagar and Anoopgarh, then crosses the Indo-Pakistan border.
The Villages in the area are named after the aanal/water distributary passing nearby. Example Village-Chak 5 BB, This is the thirteenth village on the BB Canal, Chak 4'E', is the fourth village on the E Canal/Distributary.

Climate

Demographics
According to the 2011 census Sri Ganganagar city and outgrowths had a population of 237,780. Ganganagar had a sex ratio of 859 females for every 1000 males. Males constitute 53.8% of the population and females 46.2%. Ganganagar had an effective literacy rate of 74.25%: male literacy is 88.03%, and female literacy is 76.23%. In Ganganagar, 19.6% of the population is under 6 years of age.

Religion

Majority of the population is Hindu, followed by Sikhs and Muslims.

Economy

Desert land was converted to a green town by the efforts of Maharaja Ganga Singh, who brought the Ganga Canal. It carries the excess waters of Punjab and Himachal Pradesh to the region, making Ganganagar a district known as the "food basket of Rajasthan".

The economy of the city is based on agriculture; its main crops are wheat, mustard and cotton. Other crops are guar, bajra, sugar cane and grams. In recent years, farmers are diverting towards horticulture. Kinnow (a citrus family fruit or a hybrid citrus fruit) is a popular horticultural product; other fruits of the citrus family are also grown.

Industries in Sri Ganganagar District are based on agriculture. Major industries are cotton ginning and pressing factories, mustard oil mills, wheat flour mills, Rajasthan State Ganganagar Sugar Mills (known for its Royal Heritage Liqueurs), 20 top renowned industries are Vikas WSP (P) Limited, T.C. Fresh Kinnow Waxing, Kanda Edible Oil Unit, Ruchi Soya Industries etc. It has cotton spinning and textile factories such as JCT Mills (now closed). Most of the factories are in and around Sri Ganganagar City.

Education
The most prominent Colleges and Schools in Sriganganagar are:
Maharaja Ganga Singh Dental College & Research Centre
Tantia University
 Surendera Dental college and Research Centre
 Khalsa College
 Seth G.L Bihani S.D P.G College
 Birla Public School
 Mayoor School
 Good Shepherd Public School
 Nosegay Public School
 Sacred heart Convent School

Culture

A majority of people in the district speak Bagri and Punjabi. Writers of the district have made contributions to Rajasthani literature, through Bagri.

Bagri culture dominates the district, while Punjabi culture has influence in some areas.

The embroidered odhni (mostly red) is a symbol of Bagri women. Kurto (a long shirt), Ghaghro/Ghagariyo (long frock-type clothes), Borlo/Boryo (a head ornament), and Odhni/Odhaniyo are the traditional dress of Bagri women, though the younger generation has adopted Salwar Kameez or western clothing.

The purdah (or veil) is mainly in vogue among Bagri women. Men mainly wear a pant-shirt, kurta-payjama and dhoti.

Traditional and Pop Punjabi music and Rajasthani devotional music is popular. Bollywood songs are listened to with the same enthusiasm as in other northern Indian regions.

Tourist attractions 

Bror Village: Ruins of the Indus Valley civilisation are found here. It is on Anoopgarh-Ramsinghpur road.
Anoopgarh Fort is a ruin in the city of Anoopgarh. It was built by Anoop Singh Rathore.
The Hindumalkot Border, the Indo-Pak Border, derives its name from Hindumal, the Diwan of Bikaner.

Temples and places for worship 

The landscape of Sri Ganganagar is dotted with temples and religious places. The famous temples in Sri Ganganagar include
Sukha Singh and Mehtab Singh brought here head of Massa Ranghar, who was guilty of sacrilege of Amritsar's Golden Temple, it is located near Jaitsar.
Gayatri shaktipeeth is dedicated to maa Gayatri, the goddess of vedas. the temple is at g-1-a hanuman nagar.
Ram Mandir
The Gauri Shankar Temple is dedicated to Lord Shiva. It was built using sandstone and has two cone-shaped turrets.
Siddhi Jhaanki Wale Hanumaan Ji Ka Mandir|Sidh Peeth Shri Jhaanki Wale Balaji Ji Mandir
Hanumaan Mandir is dedicated to Hanuman in the heart of the city, in L-Block.
Balaji Dhaam is on Hanumangarh Road, near the Ridhi Sidhi Enclave. This temple is surrounded by other temples (Sai Dham; Sri Ganapathi Mandir; Srigannapur Shani Dev Mandir; Khatu Shyam Mandir; Maa Chintpurni Durga Mandir and others).
Durga Mandir, Sri Ganganagar|Durga Mandir dedicated to goddess Durga, surrounded by a crowded market.
Nageshwar jyotirling temple and Sri Jagdamba Charitable Eye Hospital : The jyotirling mandir has a shivling of para (mercury). In this mandir there is a cave (Gufa) which is really amazing and must visit place. Shri Jagdamba Andh Vidhalay located next to the temple is a place where blind and deaf people get education and training.
Dada Pamparam's Dera is at Vijayanagar town, and is the samadhi (tomb) of Baba Pamparam.
Rojhri Dham is a complex of religious sites dedicated to the worship of the Hindu deity Hanuman. Dham attracts local worshipers throughout the year. On Chaitra Purnima and Ashvin Purnima every year, large  are organized, where thousands of people assemble to pay homage to the deity. The temple of Hanuman is on the right side of Anupgarh-Bikaner road, about one kilometre from Rojhri Village.
Chanana-Dham (Chanana shrine): A great temple of Lord Hanumanji is here, built in 1971.
This is where Bhai Sukha Singh and Mehtab Singh brought the head of Massa Rangarh (guilty of sacrilege of the Amritsar Golden Temple) and hung it on a tree on 11 August 1740.
Laila-Majnu ki Mazar (tomb), Binjaur village. Here is the so-called mazar of Laila-Majnu. It was built in remembrance of mutual devotion and love between a teacher and a student. A fair is held in June.
Harmilapi Shree Hanuman Mandir: Temple of Hanuman ji built in Harmilapi colony along with a Charitable clinic.

Transport 
Auto rickshaws and cycle rickshaws are majorly used for local transport in Sri Ganganagar.

Shri Ganganagar Junction railway station is a main railway station in Sri Ganganagar District

Lalgarh Airport is a main airport in Sri Ganganagar District.

Sri Ganganagar is well connected with road and is linked directly to Delhi, Jaipur, Ludhiana, Chandigarh, Sikar, Karnal, Haridwar, Bathinda, Ambala, Jodhpur and many other cities. National Highway 62 passes through Sri Ganganagar. Sri Ganganagar is directly connected to Delhi, Jaipur, Kota, Bikaner, Haridwar, Hanumangarh, Jodhpur, Ambala, Sikar, Bathinda, Firozpur, Fazilka, Howrah, Trivandrum, Nanded, Ahmedabad, Pune, Roorkee, Kanpur, Bangalore and some other cities via train.

Notable people

Jagjit Singh, Ghazal singer, was born in Sri Ganganagar
Ravinder Kaushik, former Research and Analysis Wing agent
Shyam Rangeela, Comedian
Sohum Shah, Actor, Entrepreneur, was born in Sri Ganganagar
Jagdeep Sidhu, Indian film director
Avtar Singh Cheema, First Indian to climb Mount Everest
Shahid Mallya, Famous Bollywood playback singer
Major Rajasthani, Punjabi language singer
Iqbal Singh Chahal, Municipal commissioner & administrator of Brihanmumbai Municipal Corporation

References

 
Cities and towns in Sri Ganganagar district
Planned cities in India